Bátovce is a village and municipality in the Levice District in the Nitra Region of Slovakia.

History
In historical records the village was first mentioned in 1037 as "FORUM REGINE". The second time Batovce was mentioned as "MERKATUM REGINE". In 1327 Hungarian King Karoly named Batovce as The Royal City. In the medieval times it was known as "The city of Queens" and it was one of three free cities in the Hont and Tekov region. After World War II a village called Jalaksova was connected with Batovce. During the 1970s, the Lipovina Water Dam was built and nowadays it is one of the centers of tourism in Levice region.

Geography
The village lies at an altitude of 231 metres and covers an area of 31.628 km².
It has a population of about 1075 people.

Ethnicity
The village is about 95% Slovak with a Romani minority.

Facilities
The village has a public library, a cinema, a gym and swimming pool and a football pitch.

Genealogical resources

The records for genealogical research are available at the state archive "Statny Archiv in Nitra, Slovakia"

 Roman Catholic church records (births/marriages/deaths): 1656-1896 (parish A)
 Lutheran church records (births/marriages/deaths): 1783-1903 (parish A)

See also
 List of municipalities and towns in Slovakia

External links
https://web.archive.org/web/20071116010355/http://www.statistics.sk/mosmis/eng/run.html
Surnames of living people in Batovce

Villages and municipalities in Levice District